The Women's Emergency Corps was a service organisation founded in 1914 by Evelina Haverfield, Decima Moore, and the Women's Social and Political Union to contribute to the war effort of the United Kingdom in World War I. The corps was intended to train woman doctors, nurses and motorcycle messengers. Mona Chalmers Watson became its honorary secretary. The Corps later evolved into the Women's Volunteer Reserve.

See also
 Women's Reserve Ambulance Corps
Canary girls
Victory garden
Women's Land Army (World War I)
Women's Royal Air Force (World War I)

References

Further reading
 

Organizations established in 1914
Social history of the United Kingdom
United Kingdom in World War I
Women's organisations based in the United Kingdom